The 2016–17 MRF Challenge Formula 2000 Championship was the fifth running of the MRF Challenge Formula 2000 Championship. It began on 18 November 2016 at the Bahrain International Circuit in Sakhir, Bahrain and ended on 19 February 2017 at the Madras Motor Racing Track in Chennai, India. The series comprised 16 races spread across four meetings, with the first round in Bahrain being a support event to the FIA World Endurance Championship.

Drivers

Drivers whose name appears in italics are ineligible to score points in the championship.

Calendar and results

Footnotes

Championship standings

Scoring system 

Drivers' standings

References

External links
 

2016-2017
MRF Challenge
MRF Challenge
MRF Challenge
MRF Challenge
MRF Challenge